In the United States, farmer cheese (also farmer's cheese or farmers' cheese) is pressed curds, an unripened cheese made by adding rennet and bacterial starter to coagulate and acidify milk. Farmer cheese may be made from the milk of cows, sheep or goats, with each giving its own texture and flavor.

References

American cheeses
Cheese